"Til You Cry" is a song written by Steve Bogard and Rick Giles, and recorded by American country pop artist Juice Newton for her 1987 album Emotion. In 1988, it was covered by American country music artist Eddy Raven and released in December as the third single from his compilation album The Best of Eddy Raven. The song reached number 4 on the Billboard Hot Country Singles & Tracks chart.

Chart performance

Year-end charts

References

1987 songs
1989 singles
Juice Newton songs
Eddy Raven songs
Song recordings produced by Barry Beckett
RCA Records singles
Songs written by Steve Bogard
Songs written by Rick Giles